Solon is a city located in Johnson County, Iowa, United States. Part of the Iowa City, Iowa Metropolitan Statistical Area, it is located a few miles from Lake MacBride State Park and the larger cities of Coralville and Iowa City. The population was 3,018 at the time of the 2020 census.

History
Solon was platted in 1840. It is named for the classical Athenian statesman, lawmaker, and lyric poet Solon. Ironically, the local high school's mascot is the Spartans; Sparta was famously an enemy of Athens, Solon's home. The National Register of Historic Places-listed Stone Academy is just north of town.

Geography

Demographics

2010 census
As of the census of 2010, there were 2,037 people, 759 households, and 528 families living in the city. The racial makeup of the city was 97.8% White, 0.3% African American, 0.3% Asian, 0.6% from other races, and 0.8% from two or more races. Hispanic or Latino of any race were 1.5% of the population.

There were 759 households, of which 46.2% had children under the age of 18 living with them, 55.5% were married couples living together, 9.7% had a female householder with no husband present, 4.3% had a male householder with no wife present, and 30.4% were non-families. 26.4% of all households were made up of individuals, and 10.3% had someone living alone who was 65 years of age or older. The average household size was 2.60 and the average family size was 3.17.

The median age in the city was 35.4 years. 32.2% of residents were under the age of 18; 4.4% were between the ages of 18 and 24; 29% were from 25 to 44; 20.9% were from 45 to 64; and 13.5% were 65 years of age or older. The gender makeup of the city was 48.3% male and 51.7% female.

2000 census
As of the census of 2000, there were 1,177 people, 457 households, and 304 families living in the city. The racial makeup of the city was 98.73% White, 0.25% African American, 0.08% Native American, 0.25% Pacific Islander, 0.17% from other races, and 0.51% from two or more races. Hispanic or Latino of any race were 0.17% of the population.

There were 457 households, out of which 37.6% had children under the age of 18 living with them, 54.3% were married couples living together, 9.0% had a female householder with no husband present, and 33.3% were non-families. 28.9% of all households were made up of individuals, and 12.5% had someone living alone who was 65 years of age or older. The average household size was 2.43 and the average family size was 3.04.

26.2% are under the age of 18, 7.4% from 18 to 24, 30.1% from 25 to 44, 18.5% from 45 to 64, and 17.8% who were 65 years of age or older. The median age was 38 years. For every 100 females, there were 97.8 males. For every 100 females age 18 and over, there were 86.1 males.

The median income for a household in the city was $46,953, and the median income for a family was $58,289. Males had a median income of $38,352 versus $26,111 for females. The per capita income for the city was $18,029. About 0.3% of families and 2.3% of the population were below the poverty line, including 0.6% of those under age 18 and 1.5% of those age 65 or over.

Architecture
Saints Peter and Paul Catholic Church (1916-1917), National Register of Historic Places

Education
The Solon area is served by the Solon Community School District.

Notable people
Leo Beranek, acoustics expert involved in the improvement and promotion of the Hush-a-Phone; lived in Solon for a portion of his childhood
Robin Lord Taylor, actor/director, known for his role as Oswald Cobblepot in the Fox TV series Gotham
Tyler Linderbaum, American football player

References

External links
 City of Solon
 City Data for Solon

Cities in Johnson County, Iowa
Cities in Iowa
Iowa City metropolitan area
1840 establishments in Iowa Territory